The men's K-1 1000 metres was a competition in canoeing at the 1956 Summer Olympics.  The K-1 event is raced by single-man canoe sprint kayaks. Heat and semifinals took place on December 1.

Medalists

Heats
16 competitors entered, but 13 only took part. Those 13 competitors first raced in three heats.  The top three finishers in each heat moved directly to the final.

Final

References

1956 Summer Olympics official report. p. 403.
Sports-reference.com 1956 K-1 1000 m results.

Men's K-1 1000
Men's events at the 1956 Summer Olympics